The IANR Railroad Underpass is a historic structure located in Cedar Rapids, Iowa, United States. The railroad probably built this stone arch bridge, which was completed in 1887. This kind of structure became more popular in the late 19th century as a railroad bridge because it was more durable than metal truss bridges, and they "projected a refined and sophisticated image." It features a semi-circular arch, a beltcourse, coursed-ashlar masonry, stepped wing walls that are flared, a parapet with projecting coping, and an elongated keystone with the date "1887" carved on it. The bridge was listed on the National Register of Historic Places in 1998. It now carries the Cedar River Recreation Trail over the street.

See also
 
 
 
 
 List of bridges on the National Register of Historic Places in Iowa
 National Register of Historic Places listings in Linn County, Iowa

References

Bridges completed in 1887
Arch bridges in Iowa
Bridges in Linn County, Iowa
Buildings and structures in Cedar Rapids, Iowa
National Register of Historic Places in Cedar Rapids, Iowa
Railroad bridges on the National Register of Historic Places in Iowa
Stone arch bridges in the United States